Passion, known in some releases as Passion: The Story of Percy Grainger, is a 1999 Australian drama film about some episodes in the life of the pianist and composer Percy Grainger.  It stars Richard Roxburgh as Grainger.

Plot
Passion concentrates on Grainger's unusual relationship with his mother and his sexual interests (especially his obsessive self-flagellation, though homosexuality is also hinted at), which affect his relationship with a woman who comes to love him.

It is set mainly in London in 1914, when Grainger's mother Rose was ill (she later jumped to her death in New York, following ill-founded rumours of incest with her son).

Cast
 Richard Roxburgh as Percy Grainger
 Barbara Hershey as Rose Grainger
 Bille Brown as John Grainger
 Emily Woof as Karen Holten
 Claudia Karvan as Alfhild de Luce
 Simon Burke as Hermann Sandby
 Linda Cropper as Lilith Lowery
 Julia Blake as Queen Alexandra
 Roy Billing as John Perring Jr
 Genevieve Mooy as Ada Crossley
 Peter Whitford as Tour Manager

Production
The film was shot on location in Bath, Somerset and Devon in England, and Sydney, Canberra and Michelago in Australia.

Awards and nominations
Passion won the 1999 Award of Distinction from the Australian Cinematographers Society for Martin McGrath's cinematography.

McGrath also won the Best Achievement in Cinematography award at the 1999 Australian Film Institute Awards.  AFI Awards also went to Terry Ryan for Best Achievement in Costume Design, and Murray Picknett for Best Achievement in Production Design.

AFI nominations went to Richard Roxburgh for Best Performance by an Actor in a Leading Role, Claudia Karvan and Emily Woof for Best Performance by an Actress in a Supporting Role, and Andrew Plain, Phil Judd, Guntis Sics, Anne Breslin, Jane Paterson for Best Achievement in Sound.

Claudia Karvan was nominated for the 2000 Film Critics Circle of Australia Awards for Best Supporting Actor – Female.

Director Peter Duncan was nominated for the Golden St. George at the 21st Moscow International Film Festival.

See also
Cinema of Australia

References

External links
 
Passion at Oz Movies

1999 films
1990s musical drama films
Australian musical drama films
Films shot in Australia
Films about classical music and musicians
Films about composers
Musical films based on actual events
Films about pianos and pianists
1990s English-language films
Films directed by Peter Duncan